Danny Hunter is a fictional character appearing in the first three seasons of the BBC television series Spooks, known as MI5 in the United States. The character, played by British actor David Oyelowo, is a Junior Case Officer in Section D, the counter-terrorism department of MI5.  According to the fictional Spooks: Harry's Diary—one of several spin-off books created by Kudos, the series' production company—Hunter joined Section D in June 2000.

The BBC website created for the show characterises Danny Hunter as young, sharp, and good at his job, commenting that "no-one could touch him for surveillance skills." He has expensive taste and is chewed out by department head Harry Pearce after it is discovered that he has been using MI5 resources to increase his credit limit. Nevertheless, he is able to make good decisions in high-pressure environments, as shown in the fourth episode of series 2, when he works undercover as a trader at a bank.

Danny shares his flat with colleague Helen Flynn until she is killed in the second episode of series 1. Soon thereafter fellow junior officer Zoe Reynolds becomes his new flatmate. She and Danny work well together and develop a strong friendship. Danny would like their relationship to deepen, but Zoe falls in love with photographer Will North, to whom she becomes engaged. Danny is unhappy, but his desire for Zoe to be happy overcomes his jealousy; when she is forced into exile in Chile, he disobeys orders by telling her fiancé Will where she has gone.

Danny meets his end in the last episode of series 3. A BBC source commented to the Mirror (London) that actor David Oyelowo "decided this was as far as he could take his character, Danny Hunter--who certainly doesn't see his departure coming in the show." In the episode Danny and colleague Fiona Carter are captured by Iraqi terrorists. After they attempt to escape, killing one of their captors, the leader declares that as retribution one of them must die. On the phone with Adam Carter, Fiona's husband, he gives Adam 30 seconds in which to decide which one of them should be killed. After murmuring a silent prayer, Danny deliberately provokes the terrorist in a moving final speech, mocking him for losing his humanity and sense of pity, and finally cursing him, saying "Fuck you, you death-worshipping fascist!" The infuriated terrorist promptly shoots him in the head. Danny has sacrificed himself to save Fiona and spare his colleague Adam from being forced to make the awful choice.

In the last scene in the episode fellow MI5 officer Ruth Evershed cradles Danny's head in grief and confirms that he is dead. The first episode in the next season sees the cast attending Danny's funeral, but an explosion in London forces them to leave. Ruth is particularly reluctant to do so, but in the end is persuaded by Harry Pearce.

References

Television characters introduced in 2002
Fictional assassins
Fictional Black British people
Fictional people from London
Fictional secret agents and spies
Spooks (TV series) characters